The  temple, located in Taku, Saga Prefecture is one of the oldest Confucian temples in Japan. Built in 1708, Taku Seibyō has been designated as an Important Cultural Property.

External links
 Taku City Website: Taku Seibyō 

Confucian temples in Japan
Religious buildings and structures in Saga Prefecture
Important Cultural Properties of Japan
Temples in Japan
Religious buildings and structures completed in 1708
1708 establishments in Asia
18th-century Confucian temples